Expeditie Robinson: 2001, was the second Dutch/Belgian version of the Swedish show Expedition Robinson, or Survivor as it is referred to in some countries. The series began on September 22, 2001, and concluded on December 25, 2001. The two original tribes this year were Lima (South Team) and Simbang (North Team) and the merged tribe was Periuk. The major twist of the series occurred in episode 5 when Eric Buissink, Gwann Elzen and Koenraad Schwagten competed in a challenge to determine which would return to the game in place of Hilde Jacobs, who left the competition in episode two. Koenraad won and joined the Simbang tribe. Ultimately, it was Richard Mackowiak from Belgium who won the series over Pascale Mertens, who also came from Belgium, with a jury vote of 7-0.

Finishing order

Future Appearances
Jennifer Smit, Pieter d'Hane and Richard Mackowiak returned to compete in Expeditie Robinson: Battle of the Titans.

Voting history

 At the first tribal council, both Koenraad and Lobke received two votes each.
Because of this, both had to take part in a lot drawing in order to determine who would be eliminated

 At the fifth tribal council, Koenraad had immunity as he was new to the Simbang tribe.

 As Jennifer left the competition in episode 10, it was decided that following the vote at the tenth tribal council no one would be eliminated.

 Due to his rule breaking in episode 11, Koenraad was given a penalty vote at the eleventh tribal council.

 At the twelfth tribal council, both Melanie and Richard received two votes each.
Because of this, both had to take part in a lot drawing in order to determine who would be eliminated.

External links
http://worldofbigbrother.com/Survivor/BN/2/about.shtml
https://web.archive.org/web/20100822211824/http://www.expeditie-robinson.tv/

Expeditie Robinson seasons
2001 Dutch television seasons
2001 Belgian television seasons